The 1907 County Championship was the 18th officially organised running of the County Championship, and ran from 2 May to 2 September 1907. Nottinghamshire won its first championship title, while Worcestershire and Yorkshire tied for second place. The previous season's winners, Kent, finished in eighth place.

Table
 One point was awarded for a win, and one point was taken away for each loss. Final placings were decided by dividing the number of points earned by the number of completed matches (i.e. those that ended in a win or a loss), and multiplying by 100.

Records

Batting

References

1907 in English cricket
County Championship seasons
County